Out of My Hands is the major label debut release album for Virgin Records by the band Green River Ordinance. Its sound has been compared to that of bands such as Third Eye Blind, Matchbox 20, Goo Goo Dolls, Maroon 5, Sister Hazel, and Gavin DeGraw. It peaked at #10 on the Billboard Heatseekers chart. It contains the band's single, "Come On". Another track, "Outside", was played on The Hills. "On Your Own" was aired on So You Think You Can Dance and Real World/Road Rules Challenge: The Duel 2.

Out of My Hands peaked at #10 on the Billboard Heatseekers chart. The single "Come On" reached #17 on the Billboard Adult Top 40 late in 2009; "On Your Own" reached #37 on the same chart in 2010.

The album was made available for free download from the band's Facebook page.

Track listing
"Outside"
"Come On"
"Out of My Hands"
"On Your Own"
"Goodbye L.A."
"Different (Anything at All)"
"Learning"
"Last October"
"Sleep It Off"
"Getting Older"
"Endlessly"

Personnel

Green River Ordinance
Denton Hunker - drums, percussion
Geoff Ice - bass guitar, background vocals
Jamey Ice - electric guitar
Joshua Jenkins - acoustic guitar, piano, lead vocals
Joshua Wilkerson - electric guitar, background vocals

Additional musicians
Jordan Critz - acoustic guitar, electric guitar, Hammond B-3 organ, piano, programming, string arrangements, strings, background vocals
Paul Ebersold - acoustic guitar, Hammond B-3 organ, keyboards, mellotron, piano
Mark Endert - keyboards, programming
Anthony J. Resta - electric guitar, synthesizer

References

2009 albums
Green River Ordinance (band) albums